is a Japanese former football player.

Playing career
Ochiai was born in Uki on July 11, 1981. After graduating from high school, he joined J1 League club Kashiwa Reysol in 2000. On November 23, 2002, he debuted as defensive midfielder against Sanfrecce Hiroshima. Although he played many matches as defensive midfielder in 2003, he could hardly play in the match in 2004. In September 2004, he moved to J2 League club Sagan Tosu on loan. He became a regular player as defensive midfielder. However he lost his regular position in April 2005 and he could hardly play in the match after that. In 2006, he returned to Kashiwa Reysol was relegated to J2 from 2006. However he could not play many matches. In 2007, he moved to J1 club Kawasaki Frontale. However he could not play many matches. In 2008, he moved to Japan Football League club Tochigi SC. He became a regular player and the club was promoted to J2 from 2008. Although he also played many matches as center back not only defensive midfielder until 2009, his opportunity to play decreased from 2010. He retired end of 2011 season.

Club statistics

References

External links

1981 births
Living people
People from Uki, Kumamoto
Association football people from Kumamoto Prefecture
Japanese footballers
J1 League players
J2 League players
Japan Football League players
Kashiwa Reysol players
Sagan Tosu players
Kawasaki Frontale players
Tochigi SC players
Association football defenders